Gábor Bori (born 16 January 1984) is a Hungarian professional footballer who plays for Bicske. He was seen as a player with a very bright future in Hungary.

Club career
Bori was born in Szombathely, Hungary. He was given a trial by Leicester City manager Ian Holloway on 17 December 2007, and he signed a loan deal on 8 January 2008 until the end of the season, linking up with compatriot Zsolt Laczkó, who arrived four days earlier. Part of his motivation for joining Leicester was Hungarian goalkeeper Márton Fülöp, who before being recalled to his parent club, helped him "a lot" during his trial period. Issued the number 34 shirt, both he and Laczkó were keen to earn permanent deals to stay at the club. Bori made his debut against Coventry City at the Walkers Stadium on 12 January, making four crosses and five shots in a 2–0 victory. He played a total of six league games as Leicester were relegated at the end of the season; a permanent deal never took place.

International career
Bori made his senior debut in a 3–0 friendly win over Antigua and Barbuda on 18 December 2005 at the Florida International University in Miami, earning his first and only cap courtesy of then-manager Lothar Matthäus. His last call up to the national team was on 28 March 2007, as an unused substitute in a 2–0 Euro 2008 qualifying win over Moldova.

References

External links
Gábor Bori profile at magyarfutball.hu

Living people
1984 births
Sportspeople from Szombathely
Association football fullbacks
Hungarian footballers
Hungary international footballers
Szombathelyi Haladás footballers
Győri ETO FC players
MTK Budapest FC players
BFC Siófok players
Leicester City F.C. players
Újpest FC players
Kecskeméti TE players
FC Volendam players
Paksi FC players
Diósgyőri VTK players
Vasas SC players
Gyirmót FC Győr players
Monori SE players
III. Kerületi TUE footballers
Nemzeti Bajnokság I players
Eerste Divisie players
Hungarian expatriate footballers
Expatriate footballers in England
Expatriate footballers in the Netherlands
Hungarian expatriate sportspeople in England
Hungarian expatriate sportspeople in the Netherlands